Henry Edser (1862 – 9 December 1938) was a New Zealand cricketer who played two matches of first-class cricket for Canterbury in the 1883–84 season.

Edser was a bowler and useful lower-order batsman who went on Canterbury's northern tour in December-January 1883–84. He did little in the first match against Auckland, but in the second match, against Wellington, he took 5 for 65 and 8 for 75, as well as scoring some useful runs in a low-scoring match, to help take Canterbury to a 15-run victory. However, he played no further matches for Canterbury.

Edser was a civil servant. He and his wife Annie had two children before she died in 1894. He died in 1938.

References

External links
 
 Henry Edser at Cricket Archive

1862 births
1938 deaths
People from Islington (district)
New Zealand cricketers
Canterbury cricketers
English emigrants to New Zealand